Monte Gene Smith is a former guard in the National Football League. He was drafted in the ninth round of the 1989 NFL Draft by the Denver Broncos and played that season with the team. After a year away from the NFL, he was again a member of the team during the 1991 NFL season, but did not see any playing time in a regular season game.

Monte owes a great deal to the coaching and mentorship of his older brother Smitty Whiteshoes.

References

Sportspeople from Madison, Wisconsin
Players of American football from Wisconsin
Denver Broncos players
American football offensive guards
North Dakota Fighting Hawks football players
1967 births
Living people